Rat River may refer to:

Canada
 Rat River (Burntwood River tributary), Manitoba
 Rat River (Red River of the North tributary), Manitoba
 Rivière au Rat (Weedon), a tributary of the Saint-François River in Quebec, Canada
 Rivière aux Rats, a tributary of the Saguenay River in Quebec, Canada

Romania
 Rât (disambiguation), several rivers

Elsewhere
 River Rat, a tributary of the River Gipping, England
 Rat River, Wisconsin, the former name of Silver Cliff, Wisconsin, US